The Three from the Filling Station is a 1955 West German musical film directed by Hans Wolff and starring Adrian Hoven, Walter Müller and Walter Giller. It was shot at the Tempelhof Studios in West Berlin and on location around the city. The film's sets were designed by the art directors Kurt Herlth and Hans Kuhnert.

The film is a remake of the 1930 UFA film The Three from the Filling Station. It was one of a series of remakes made during the 1950s of major hits during the Weimar and Nazi eras. A separate French-language remake The Road to Paradise was released in 1956.

Synopsis
After losing their money, three young men go to work at a filling station where they all fall in love with the same woman.

Cast

References

Bibliography
 Bergfelder, Tim & Bock, Hans-Michael. ''The Concise Cinegraph: Encyclopedia of German. Berghahn Books, 2009.

External links

1955 films
1955 musical comedy films
German musical comedy films
West German films
1950s German-language films
Films set in Berlin
Remakes of German films
Films directed by Hans Wolff
German multilingual films
1950s multilingual films
1950s German films
Films shot in Berlin
Films shot at Tempelhof Studios